Glen Esk or Glenesk may refer to:

 Glen Esk, Queensland, a locality in the Somerset Region, Queensland, Australia
 Glenesk, a suburb in Johannesburg, South Africa
 Glenesk Folk Museum, a museum in Angus, Scotland
 Glenesk railway station, a railway station in Midlothian, Scotland
 Glen Esk, along the River North Esk, one of the Five Glens of Angus, Scotland
 Glen Esk, a historic building at Towson University in Maryland, US
Glen Esk Valley in New Zealand, home to Glen Esk Road, stream, and dam. Also written as Glenesk and near Piha Beach and the Kitekite Falls